Diamond Bar High School (DBHS) is a public high school located in Diamond Bar, California, as part of the Walnut Valley Unified School District.

Diamond Bar High School's mascot is the Brahma, and the school colors are purple and gold. Diamond Bar High School students participate in programs such as Advanced Placement (AP) and International Baccalaureate (IB). During the school year, DBHS received an Academic Performance Index of 870, and 97% of students passed the California High School Exit Exam in 2008-2009. The Brahma Athletic teams will compete in the Palomares League of the CIF Southern Section in 2014–15.

History
Diamond Bar High School was founded in 1982 and was the growing city's first high school.  Diamond Bar High School is part of the Walnut Valley Unified School District, which was established in 1970. Diamond Bar High's first students were residents that lived in south Diamond Bar (specifically residents that lived south of Diamond Bar's Grand Avenue). It is a dividing line that still exists today. Prior to the opening of DBHS, the area's students were bused from Diamond Bar to Walnut High School. Some of the teachers came from Suzanne Middle School, Chaparral Middle School and Walnut High School. The first principal of the school was Walt Holmes, who came to DBHS from North Monterey County High School in Castroville, California, where he also served as principal.

Academic programs
Diamond Bar High School has a relatively rigorous and competitive atmosphere for a public high school. It is ranked 219 on the US News's Best High Schools in the nation and ranked 39 on the best California high schools.

Pathways Communications Academy
Pathways is an alternate program offered to students. The program offers different courses and class schedules. The curriculum includes a broad range of college preparatory courses and work experience classes.

Brahma Tech Academy
Brahma Tech is a curriculum-driven academic diploma program with an emphasis on the relevance and application of STEM - science, technology, engineering, and mathematics in today's workplace. The goal of Brahma Tech is to address the need for a stronger and more specific STEM education by equipping students with a competent set of skills in these critical fields.

The Brahma Tech curriculum, spanning four years of high school, consists of an entry-level course called Computer Systems, followed by designated courses in one of four subsidiaries (or "strands") of the student's choice concluding with a 150-hour internship.

The four strands available are:

Information Information and Communication Technology: How technology is utilized in the realms of journalism, global society, and enterprise.

Digital Media and Design: How to utilize graphic design technology to create and publish works ranging from illustration, photography, to the yearbook.

Engineering and Architecture: An introduction to engineering from architectural design, robotics, to computer repair. Advanced courses focus solely on engineering design.

Computer Science: An introduction to computer science principles in both programming and hardware repairs. Students will be able to take an AP class.

The 150-hour Internship not only includes an online internship course but also Seminars and a Senior Presentation about a topic of their choice.

Students who successfully complete the program will receive a STEM diploma and have the honor of wearing the academy stole at graduation. The Brahma Tech program also offers a competitive internship at The Boeing Company, to which a minimum of five students are offered positions. While scholarships are available, if a student were to take this internship opportunity, he or she is thus bound to the program and is forced to complete the program, no matter the cost.

Music program
In March 2013, the Diamond Bar High Symphony Orchestra competed at the prestigious National Orchestra Cup held at the Lincoln Center in New York with Tchaikovsky's masterpiece "Swan Lake." In addition to finishing second overall, the orchestra also brought home the Best String Section and Best High String Soloist Awards; the latter was won by concertmaster Johnny Wang.
In April 2013, the Diamond Bar concert percussion ensemble were the Southern California Percussion Alliance PSCO champions (placing first) in San Bernardino, CA, and placed second at the Winter Guard International world championships in Dayton, Ohio. They performed the show, "Star-Crossed Lovers," an arrangement of music surrounding the story of Romeo & Juliet. It was arranged by instructor Gabriel Cobas. In addition, in the same year, the Diamond Bar indoor drumline placed third at the Southern California Percussion Alliance PSA finals, with a show named "Bushido."

Diamond Bar High School has been recognized as the 2014 National Grammy Signature School, thanks to the choral and instrumental music programs at DBHS.

Extracurriculars
In addition to its music program and academic curriculum, Diamond Bar High School also offers several extracurricular activities for students to participate in.

FIRST Robotics Team 3473
The Diamond Bar High School robotics team, Team Sprocket, was founded in 2011 as a team in the FIRST Robotics Competition program. It participated in FIRST Championship in 2011 after becoming a finalist in the Las Vegas Regional. This team requires students to build a fully functional robot in 6 weeks to participate in regionals. In 2017, the team qualified for Championships at the San Diego Regional, and again in Orange County Regional in 2018. In an effort to expand STEM outreach, it started a Summer Robotics Workshop for children in nearby elementary schools.

FIRST Robotics Team 5857
The inter-high school robotics team, Walnut Valley Robotics (WVR), was founded in 2015 as a team in the FIRST Robotics Competition program. The team was founded in conjunction with students coming from the Walnut Valley Unified School District, specifically members from Diamond Bar High School and Walnut High School. In its first competition in the 2015-2016 FRC season, Team 5857 won the Rookie Inspiration Award at the San Diego Regional. Later on, the team would go on to win the Engineering Inspiration Award at the 2019 Aerospace Valley Regional. The team participated in 2018 and 2019 FIRST Championship hosted in Houston, Texas. The team has hosted community events, including a regional FIRST Lego League (FLL) event at Diamond Ranch High School.

Notable alumni
 Desiree Burch, 1997, Comedian, Actor, Theatre Maker and Presenter
 Jonathon Amaya, 2006, Football, Miami Dolphins
 Gary Brown, 2007, Baseball, St. Louis Cardinals
 Mike Burns (baseball pitcher), 1996, Baseball, Cincinnati Reds
 Ling Ling Chang, state senate member
 Danny Dorn, 2002, Baseball, Arizona Diamondbacks
 Jim Edmonds, 1988, Baseball, St. Louis Cardinals, Cardinals Hall of Famer, 2006 World Series Champion
 Danny Im, 1996, member of Korean hip hop group 1TYM
 Bret Lockett, 2005, Football, New England Patriots
 Nadia Mejia, 2013, Pageantry, Miss California USA 2016, place in the Top 5 at Miss USA 2016
 Alex Morgan, 2007, Soccer, USWNT Captain 2012 London Olympic Gold Medalist, 2015 World Cup Champion, 2019 World Cup Champion
 Kevin Na, 2001, Golf, PGA Tour Professional, 4 time PGA Tour winner
 Donte Nicholson, 2000, Football, Tampa Bay Buccaneers
 Teddy Park, 1996, record producer/rapper under YG Entertainment in South Korea, member of Korean hip hop group 1TYM
 Jessica Penne, professional Mixed Martial Artist, inaugural Invicta FC Atomweight Champion, currently competing in the UFC Strawweight Division
 Devyn Puett, 1996, former child actress/singer/dancer, now real estate agent
 Tiffany Young, member of Girls' Generation
 Keith Van Horn, 1993, Basketball, Dallas Mavericks
 Ryan Wendell, 2004, Football, New England Patriots, Super Bowl XLIX Champion 
 Jason Wright, 2000, football executive and businessman, Washington Football Team
Charlet Chung, 2001, Actress, best known for voice acting in video games such as Overwatch (video game) and Call of Duty: Black Ops III, alongside other roles.
Ryan Satin, former cast member, Laguna Beach: The Real Orange County and WWE correspondent for Fox Sports

References

External links
 

1982 establishments in California
Diamond Bar, California
Educational institutions established in 1982
High schools in Los Angeles County, California
International Baccalaureate schools in California
Public high schools in California